Johannes "Jan" Leonardus Maas (17 June 1900 – 5 September 1977) was a Dutch racing cyclist who competed in the 1924 Summer Olympics and in the 1928 Summer Olympics.

In 1924 he was part of the Dutch pursuit team which was eliminated in the first round of the team pursuit event. As a member of the Dutch road racing team he finished sixth in the team road race, after finishing 19th in the individual road race.

Four years later he won the silver medal as part of the Dutch pursuit team.

See also
 List of Dutch Olympic cyclists

References

External links
 Databaseolympics.com

1900 births
1977 deaths
Dutch male cyclists
Dutch track cyclists
Olympic cyclists of the Netherlands
Cyclists at the 1924 Summer Olympics
Cyclists at the 1928 Summer Olympics
Olympic silver medalists for the Netherlands
People from Steenbergen
Olympic medalists in cycling
Medalists at the 1928 Summer Olympics
Cyclists from North Brabant
20th-century Dutch people